Cladonotinae is a subfamily of groundhoppers (Orthoptera: Caelifera) containing more than 70 genera and 260 described species.  These insects are found in tropical areas world-wide.

Tribes and Genera
The following genera, in four tribes, belong to the subfamily Cladonotinae:

Choriphyllini
Auth. Cadena-Castañeda & Silva, 2019; central America
 Choriphyllum Serville, 1838
 Phyllotettix Hancock, 1902

Cladonotini
Auth. Bolívar, 1887; tropical Asia
 Boczkitettix Tumbrinck, 2014
 Cladonotus Saussure, 1862
 Deltonotus Hancock, 1904
 Diotarus Stål, 1877
 Dolatettix Hancock, 1907
 Gignotettix Hancock, 1909
 Hancockella Uvarov, 1940
 Holoarcus Hancock, 1909
 Hymenotes Westwood, 1837
 Misythus Stål, 1877
 Piezotettix Bolívar, 1887
 Yunnantettix Zheng, 1995

Mucrotettigini
Auth. Cadena-Castañeda & Silva, 2019; South America
 Antillotettix Perez-Gelabert, 2003
 Armasius Perez-Gelabert & Yong, 2014
 Bahorucotettix Perez-Gelabert, Hierro & Otte, 1998
 Cubanotettix Perez-Gelabert, Hierro & Otte, 1998
 Cubonotus Perez-Gelabert, Hierro & Otte, 1998
 Eleleus Bolívar, 1887
 Haitianotettix Perez-Gelabert, Hierro & Otte, 1998
 Hottettix Perez-Gelabert, Hierro & Otte, 1998
 Mucrotettix Perez-Gelabert, Hierro & Otte, 1998
 Sierratettix Perez-Gelabert, Hierro & Otte, 1998
 Tiburonotus Perez-Gelabert, Hierro & Otte, 1998
 Truncotettix Perez-Gelabert, Hierro & Otte, 1998
 † Baeotettix Heads, 2009
 † Electrotettix Heads & Thomas, 2014

Valalyllini
Auth.: Deranja, Kasalo, Adžić, Franjević & Skejo, 2022; Madagascar
 Lepocranus - monotypic L. fuscus Devriese, 1991
 Valalyllum - monotypic V. folium Deranja, Kasalo, Adžić, Franjević & Skejo, 2022

Xerophyllini
Auth. Günther, 1979; SE Asia

genus group Potua
 Cladonotella Hancock, 1909
 Gestroana Berg, 1898
 Notredamia Skejo, Deranja & Adžić, 2020
 Potua Bolívar, 1887
other genera
 Acmophyllum Karsch, 1890
 Astyalus Rehn, 1939
 Cladoramus Hancock, 1907
 Morphopoides Rehn, 1930
 Morphopus Bolívar, 1905
 Pantelia Bolívar, 1887
 Paulytettix Devriese, 1999
 Royitettix Devriese, 1999
 Sanjetettix Devriese, 1999
 Seyidotettix Rehn, 1939
 Trachytettix Stål, 1876
 Trypophyllum Karsch, 1890
 Xerophyllum Fairmaire, 1846

incertae sedis

 Afrolarcus Günther, 1979
 Anaselina Storozhenko, 2019
 Aspiditettix Liang, Chen, Li & Chen, 2009
 Astyalus Rehn, 1939
 Austrohancockia Günther, 1938
 Cladoramus Hancock, 1907
 Cota Bolívar, 1887
 Dasyleurotettix Rehn, 1904
 Devriesetettix Tumbrinck, 2014
 Epitettix Hancock, 1907
 Eurymorphopus Hancock, 1907
 Fieberiana Kirby, 1914
 Gibbotettix Zheng, 1992
 Hippodes Karsch, 1890
 Hypsaeus Bolívar, 1887
 Ichikawatettix Tumbrinck, 2014
 Ingrischitettix Tumbrinck, 2014
 Microthymochares Devriese, 1991
 Morphopoides Rehn, 1930
 Morphopus Bolívar, 1905
 Nesotettix Holdhaus, 1909
 Oxyphyllum Hancock, 1909
 Pantelia Bolívar, 1887
 Paraselina Storozhenko, 2019
 Paulytettix Devriese, 1999
 Pelusca Bolívar, 1912
 Peraxelpa Sjöstedt, 1932
 Planotettix Tumbrinck, 2014
 Pseudepitettix Zheng, 1995
 Pseudohyboella Günther, 1938
 Royitettix Devriese, 1999
 Sanjetettix Devriese, 1999
 Selivinga Storozhenko, 2019
 Seyidotettix Rehn, 1939
 Stegaceps Hancock, 1913
 Tepperotettix Rehn, 1952
 Tetradinodula Zha, 2017
 Tettilobus Hancock, 1909
 Thymochares Rehn, 1929
 Tondanotettix Willemse, 1928
 Trachytettix Stål, 1876
 Trypophyllum Karsch, 1890
 Tuberfemurus Zheng, 1992
 Willemsetettix Tumbrinck, 2014
 † Acmophyllum Karsch, 1890
 † Paraphyllum Hancock, 1913

References

Further reading

 
 

Tetrigidae